Pseudo-Epiphanius is the name given to an anonymous eighth-century Christian author of a selection of legends about the lives of the twelve apostles.

References

Christian writers
New Testament apocrypha
8th-century Christians